A list of people, who died during the 9th century, who have received recognition as Blessed (through beatification) or Saint (through canonization) from the Catholic Church:

See also 

Christianity in the 9th century

References

09
09
Saint